Sirop Arslanian actually Serop Arslanian (born 27 November 1966) is a former Lebanese racing cyclist who competed at the 1984 Summer Olympics in the individual road race.

References

1966 births
Living people
Lebanese male cyclists
Olympic cyclists of Lebanon
Cyclists at the 1984 Summer Olympics